Scissor Sisters are an American band that formed in New York City in 2001. The group gained prominence after signing with the independent record label A Touch of Class and their songs "Electrobix" and "Comfortably Numb" (a Pink Floyd cover) were picked up by underground disc jockeys in nightclubs. They have released four studio albums: Scissor Sisters (2004), Ta-Dah (2006), Night Work (2010) and Magic Hour (2012). The group's remix EP, Remixed!, was released through A Touch of Class in September 2004 and the iTunes live EP iTunes Festival: London 2010 was released digitally in 2010. The band has also produced two video albums: We Are Scissor Sisters... And So Are You (2004) and Hurrah! A Year of Ta-Dah (2007).

Scissor Sisters was released through Polydor Records in February 2004 in the United Kingdom and through Universal Records in July 2004 in the United States. Singles from the album included "Laura", "Take Your Mama", "Mary" and "Filthy/Gorgeous". Scissor Sisters earned the group five awards, including three BRIT Awards (Best International Group, Best International Breakthrough Act, and Best International Album), a Bambi Prize (Shooting Star), and a GLAAD Media Award for Outstanding Music Artist. Ta-Dah was released through the same labels in September 2006. Singles included "I Don't Feel Like Dancin'", "Land of a Thousand Words", "She's My Man" and "Kiss You Off". The album earned the group a second GLAAD Media Award for Outstanding Music Artist and an Ivor Novello Award for Most Performed Work for "I Don't Feel Like Dancin'". Singles from Night Work included "Fire with Fire", "Any Which Way" and "Invisible Light". The music video for the latter song earned Scissor Sisters and director Roger Bellés three nominations from the UK Music Video Awards. Singles from Magic Hour included "Shady Love", "Only the Horses", "Baby Come Home" and  "Let's Have a Kiki".

Other recognitions include the Gig of the Year award from Virgin Radio for their performance at the 2004 V Festival, and the inclusion of Scissor Sisters and Ta-Dah on Out'''s "100 Greatest, Gayest Albums" list. Scissor Sisters have also been recognized by the Grammy Awards (Best Dance Recording nomination for "Comfortably Numb"), International Dance Music Awards, Meteor Music Awards, NME Awards, O Music Awards and Q Awards. Overall, Scissor Sisters have received 11 awards from 33 nominations.

Bambi Prize
Created in 1948, the Bambi is an annual television and media prize awarded by the German media company Hubert Burda Media. Scissor Sisters have received one award from one nomination.

Best Art Vinyl
The Best Art Vinyl Awards are yearly awards established in 2005 by Art Vinyl Ltd to celebrate the best album artwork of the past year. 
{| class="wikitable"
|-
!Year
!width="250"|Nominated work
!width="325"|Award
!width="65"|Result
!Ref.
|-
| align="center"|2006
| Ta-Dah| Best Vinyl Art
| 
|

Billboard Music Awards
The Billboard Music Awards honor artists for commercial performance in the U.S., based on record charts published by Billboard. The awards are based on sales data by Nielsen SoundScan and radio information by Nielsen Broadcast Data Systems. The award ceremony was held from 1990 to 2007, until its reintroduction in 2011. 

|-
| rowspan=2|2005
| Scissor Sisters 
| Top Electronic Artist
| 
|-
| rowspan=2|Scissor Sisters| rowspan=2|Top Electronic Album
| 
|-
| rowspan=2|2006
| 
|-
| Scissor Sisters
| Top Electronic Artist
| 

Brit Awards
The Brit Awards are the British Phonographic Industry's (BPI) annual pop music awards. Scissor Sisters have received three awards from six nominations.

GAFFA Awards (Denmark)
Delivered since 1991. The GAFFA Awards (Danish: GAFFA Prisen) are a Danish award that rewards popular music awarded by the magazine of the same name.
{| class="wikitable"
|-
!Year
!width="250"|Nominated work
!width="325"|Award
!width="65"|Result
!Ref.
|-
| align="center" rowspan=2|2004
| Scissor Sisters
| Best Foreign New Act
| 
|rowspan=2|
|-
| "Take Your Mama"
| Best Foreign Hit
| 

GLAAD Media Awards
The GLAAD Media Awards were created in 1990 by the Gay & Lesbian Alliance Against Defamation (GLAAD) to recognize and honor the mainstream media for their fair, accurate and inclusive representations of the LGBT community. Scissor Sisters have received three awards from four nominations.

Grammy Awards
The Grammy Awards are awarded annually by the National Academy of Recording Arts and Sciences of the United States for outstanding achievements in the record industry. Often considered the highest music honor, the awards were established in 1958. Scissor Sisters have been nominated once.

International Dance Music Awards
The International Dance Music Awards, which take place during the annual Winter Music Conference, recognize achievements in the electronic dance music industry. Scissor Sisters have received one award from four nominations.

Ivor Novello Awards
The Ivor Novello Awards, named after the Cardiff-born entertainer Ivor Novello, are awards for songwriting and composing. Scissor Sisters have received one award from one nomination.

New York Music Awards
{| class="wikitable"
|-
!Year
!width="250"|Nominated work
!width="325"|Award
!width="65"|Result
!Ref.
|-
| rowspan=5|2011
| rowspan=2|Themselves
| Best Alternative Band
| 
| rowspan=5|
|-
| Best Club Band
| 
|-
| rowspan=2|Jake Shears
| Best Alternative Frontperson
| 
|-
| Best Male Dance Artist
| 
|-
| Night Work| Best Dance Album
| 

Meteor Music Awards
The Meteor Music Awards are distributed by MCD Productions and are the national music awards of Ireland. Scissor Sisters have received one award from four nominations.

NME Awards
The NME Awards are an annual music awards show founded by the music magazine NME. Scissor Sisters have received three nominations.

O Music Awards
The O Music Awards, hosted by MTV, honor "artists, innovators and fans impacting digital music culture". Scissor Sisters have been nominated once.

 Q Awards 
The Q Awards are the UK's annual pop music awards run by the music magazine Q magazine to honor musical excellence. Winners are voted by readers of Q. Scissor Sisters have received five nominations.

The Record of the Year
The Record of the Year was an award voted by the UK public. The award began in 1998, and was televised on ITV before being dropped in 2006 after disagreements over the phone voting element. Since then it has been an online poll, administered through the Record of the Year website. In 2013, it was axed, signaling the end of the award.
{| class="wikitable"
|-
!Year
!width="250"|Nominated work
!width="325"|Award
!width="65"|Result
!Ref.
|-
| align="center"|2004
| "Laura"
| rowspan=2|Record of the Year
| 
| rowspan=2|
|-
| align="center"|2006
| "I Don't Feel Like Dancin'"
| 

UK Music Video Awards
The UK Music Video Awards recognize "creativity and technical excellence" in music videos made within the United Kingdom. The music video for "Invisible Light" earned the group and director Roger Bellés an award for Best Art Direction and Design in a Video. Scissor Sisters have received one award from three nominations.

Other recognitions
 2004 – Gay members of the band, Jake Shears, Babydaddy, and Del Marquis, were part of Out's "List of the 100 Most Intriguing Gay People of the Year"
 2004 – For their performance at the 2004 V Festival, Scissor Sisters won the "Gig of the Year" award from Virgin Radio
 2006 – Scissor Sisters was included in Robert Dimery's book, 1001 Albums You Must Hear Before You Die2008 – Out magazine ranked Scissor Sisters number 26 and Ta-Dah'' number 81 on their "100 Greatest, Gayest Albums" list

References

External links
Scissor Sisters' official site

Scissor Sisters
Awards and nominations